Teixeira Soares is a municipality in the state of Paraná in the Southern Region of Brazil. Its population estimated by the IBGE is 12,567 inhabitants (2020).

See also
List of municipalities in Paraná

References

Municipalities in Paraná